The 2014 Women's Dubai Sevens was the opening tournament of the 2014–15 World Rugby Women's Sevens Series. It was  held over the weekend of 4–5 December 2014 at The Sevens Stadium in Dubai, and was the third edition of the Women's Dubai Sevens as part of the World Rugby Women's Sevens Series.

Format
The teams are drawn into three pools of four teams each. Each team plays every other team in their pool once. The top two teams from each pool advance to the Cup/Plate brackets while the top 2 third place teams also compete in the Cup/Plate. The other teams from each group play-off for the Bowl.

Teams
The participating teams and schedule were announced on 15 October 2014.

Match officials
The match officials for the 2014 Dubai Sevens are as follows:

  Jesse Beard (New Zealand)
  James Bolabiu (Fiji)
  Sara Cox (England)
  Steve Lee (England)
  Alhambra Nievas (Spain)
  Amy Perrett (Australia)
  Rasta Rasivhenge (South Africa)

Pool Stage

Pool A

Pool B

Pool C

Knockout stage

Bowl

Plate

Cup

References

External links
 HSBC Women's Sevens Website

2014–15
2014–15 World Rugby Women's Sevens Series
rugby union
2014 in women's rugby union
2014 rugby sevens competitions
2014 in Asian rugby union
December 2014 sports events in Asia